Freitas is a very common surname in Madeira Autonomous Region, Portugal. Its origin seems related to the 300-million-year-old 'Birthing Stones' phenomenon which occurs in remote northern Portugal, locally called , particularly in the village of Castanheira, nestled into the site of Freita Mountain, Arouca Geopark. 

According to the Dictionary of American Family Names citing Oxford University Press, it is a topographic name for someone who lived on a patch of stony ground, from Portuguese (Pedras) Freitas ‘Broken Stones’ Late Latin (Petrae) Fractae.

Gallery

References

Portuguese-language surnames
Toponymic surnames